The following is a list of Grand Canyon Antelopes men's basketball head coaches. There have been 14 head coaches of the Antelopes in their 74-season history.

Grand Canyon's current head coach is Bryce Drew. He was hired as the Antelopes' head coach in March 2020, replacing Dan Majerle, who was fired after the 2019–20 season.

References

Grand Canyon

Grand Canyon Antelopes basketball, men's, coaches